Zuiddorpe is a village in the Dutch province of Zeeland. It is a part of the municipality of Terneuzen, and lies about 34 km southeast of Vlissingen.

History 
The village was first mentioned in 1366 or 1367 as Zuutdorp, and means "southern village". South has been added to distinguish from Westdorpe and is relative to Axel. Zuiddorpe is a road village with a village square. A parish has been known to exist since 1236 which was called "De Moeren" in reference to the peat excavation in the nearby moorlands.

The Catholic Assumption of Mary church is a three-aisled church with a tower in the north-western corner. It was built between 1885 and 1886 to replace its 1817 predecessor. The church has a richly decorated pulpit from 1637.

Zuiddorpe was home to 702 people in 1840. It was a separate municipality until 1970, when it was merged with Axel. In 2003, it became part of the municipality of Terneuzen.

References

Populated places in Zeeland
Former municipalities of Zeeland
Terneuzen